The Far-Western Development Region (Nepali: सुदुर पश्चिमाञ्चल विकास क्षेत्र, Sudur Pashchimānchal Bikās Kshetra) was one of Nepal's five development regions.  It was located at the western end of the country and had its headquarters in Dipayal.

The Far-Western Region covered 19,539 square kilometers. It had nine districts with the regional headquarters at Dipayal, Doti district. The Far-Western Region was remote and developmentally challenged. Some 44% of people in the Far West Hills and 49% in the Himalayan districts lived below the poverty line. The region had limited basic services. The difficult topography complicated development. The region had complex socio-economic structures along with widespread gender- and caste-based discrimination. Traditional systems associated with religion, culture and customs had limited overall development.

It comprised two zones:
 Mahakali
 Seti

The region was sometimes called the Doti region, which some believe originated from 'Dovati' meaning land between two rivers.  Others believed it originated from the Hindu god Dev and Aatavi, meaning the place of re-creation. History went back to the 13th century when Niranjan Malldeo founded the Doti Kingdom following the fall of the Katyuri Kings. Dotiyali and Kumauni were spoken there. Deuda, Jhoda, Chhpeli, Chhaliya, Bhada etc. were traditional regional dances and Gaura/Gamara is the biggest festival.

History
Doti was an ancient kingdom of the Far-Western region of Kumaon  which was formed after disintegration of the Katyuri kingdom of Kumaon and the Far-Western region during the 13th century. Doti was one of eight princely states formed after the Kurmanchal Kingdom broke up. The others were Baijnath-Katyuri, Dwarahat, Doti, Baramandal, Askot, Sira, Sora and Sui (Kali kumaon). The kingdom broke up because of the invasion of Khas kings Ashoka challa and Krachalla from Karnali Zone (Dullu) of Nepal in 1191 and 1223 respectively. Later on, the land between Ramganga on the west (Uttarakhand) and the Karnali  on the east (which divides the Far-Western region from the rest of Nepal) came under Raikas after the origin of Raikas of Katyuris in Doti. "Brahma Dev Mandi" at Kanchanpur District of Mahakali Zone was established by Katyuri king Brahma Dev.

Raikas
Niranjan Malla Dev founded Doti Kingdom around the 13th century after the fall of Katyuris Kingdom. He was the son of Last Katyuris of united Katyuris  kingdom. Kings of Doti were known as Raikas (also known as Rainka Maharaj). The Raikas, after the overthrow Khas Malla of Karnali Zone, formed a Raikas Kingdom in the Far-Western Region and Kumaun that was called Doti. So far, the historical evidence for the following Raikas has been discovered:

Niranjan Malla Dev (Founder of Doti Kingdom), Nagi Malla  (1238),  Ripu Malla (1279), Nirai Pal (1353 may be of Askot and historical evidence of him from 1354 AD has been found in Almoda),   Nag Malla (1384), Dhir Malla (1400),  Ripu Malla (1410), Anand Malla (1430), Balinarayan Malla (not known), Sansar Malla (1442), Kalyan Malla (1443), Suratan Malla (1478), Kriti Malla (1482), Prithivi Malla (1488), Medini Jay Malla (1512), Ashok Malla (1517),  Raj Malla (1539), Arjun Malla/Sahi (not known but he was ruling Sira as Malla and Doti as Shahi), Bhupati Malla/Shahi (1558), Sagaram Shahi (1567), Hari Malla/Shahi (1581 Last Raikas King of Sira and adjoining part of Nepal),   Rudra Shahi (1630),   Vikram Shahi (1642), Mandhata Shahi (1671), Raghunath Shahi (1690), Hari Shahi (1720), Krishna Shahi (1760), Deep Shahi (1785), Prithivi pati Shahi (1790, 'he had fought against the Nepali Ruler  (Gorkhali Ruler) with British in 1814 A.D').

The historic place of war between the Doti Kingdom and Nepal (Gorkha kingdom) during the period of Gorkha Expansion in 1790, according to the history of Nepal, is Nari-Dang, on the bank of the Seti River. The Dumrakot was the base of Doti Kingdom for fighting against Gorkhali.

Mongol/Mughal invasion
During the period of Akbar, 16th century, Mongols (Mughals) attacked the Raikas. They invaded Ajemeru, capital of the Raikas Kingdom. Ajemeru is now in Dadeldhura District in the Far-Western region. According to Indo-Persian historian Abd-ul-Qadir Bada'uni (c. 1540 – 1615), Army Chief of Akbar, Khan, lured by the wealth and treasury of the Raikas state, attempted to plunder the state,  but did not succeed.

Major cities
Dhangadhi is a sub metropolitan city in Far-Western Nepal (Sudurpashchim Province) is located in Kailali District of Seti Zone.

Mahendranagar is the headquarters of the Kanchanpur District in Mahakali Zone.  It is located nearby Mahakali River, 6 km north of the India border, and is inhabited by the indigenous Tharu people and other groups.

Tikapur is another biggest city in the Far-Western region. It was popular for tourism and trade as it serves the best transit point for Nepal-India border in the Far-Western region.

Dipayal-Silgadhi Municipality is the headquarters of Doti District and the Far-Western Region.  It was within trekking distance of Khaptad National Park. Dipayal was also the name of the valley encompassing the Seti River.

Amargadhi was the headquarters of Dadeldhura District.

Akhand Sudurpaschim
Akhand Sudurpaschim (अखण्ड सुदूरपश्चिम) is a movement orchestrated by the natives of Far Western Region aiming to create a separate state and self-determination rights(independence) for the native population. Natives have claimed two districts of Madhesh plain region: Kailali and Kanchanpur, while Madheshi based parties want a separate Madhesh province along with the two districts that geographically lie in the Terai-Madhesh Plains. The Far Western Region, inhabited by a majority of Doteli speaking people as of the 2011 census, shares a border with the Indian district of Uttarakhand and shares a similar ethnicity, language and culture. A movement against the central State “half-blood behavior" began on 26 April 2012, effectively halting state services, and ended upon the dissolution of the constitutional assembly on 28 May 2012.

References

External links
Farwesternnepal.com
Un.org.np 
Thegreathimalayatrail.org 
Farwesternnepal.org 

Regions of Nepal
Former subdivisions of Nepal
2015 disestablishments in Nepal